Premier FMCG (Pty) Ltd, commonly referred to as Premier, is a South African food manufacturer. The company is headquartered in Waterfall City, Johannesburg.

Premier owns many well-known South African food brands, including Blue Ribbon, Snowflake, Manhattan, and Lil-lets. The company also sells the Lil-lets brand in the United Kingdom and Ireland.

The company exports food from South Africa to other markets, including Mozambique.

History
Premier Milling Company Ltd ("Premier") was established in 1913 by Joffe Marks, as the successor business to Marks & Co (Founded 1890), which began with a single mill at Fordsburg, and quickly expanded to include flour and maize mills in Newtown, the acquisition of Union Flour Mills and the Vereeniging Milling Company (1934) which evolved into Epic Oil Mills and EPOL animal feeds.

Marks and his nephews of the Jaffee and Bloom families expanded and diversified the business into an industrial giant, becoming the largest industrial food producer in the Southern Hemisphere, and employing as many as 49,000 people. As Premier grew it incorporated more bakeries, mills, product lines and brands. In 1964 Premier acquired the South African Milling Company (which originated from Attwell's Bakery, founded in 1820), and added divisions for Pharmaceuticals (https://apnews.com/article/6d911895f4bf18e91bcfad89a3932921), Cash & Carry, Retail, Entertainment & Fisheries (See "World Fishing Fleets: An Analysis of Distant-water Fleet Operations Past, Present Future", Nov. 1993, NOAA).In the mid-1960s, a controlling interest was acquired from the Jaffee/Bloom families by Associated British Foods PLC ("Westons"). Within two decades Premier's assets had grown to $1.67 billion, and Westons sold its 52% stake to a consortium led by the Anglo American Corporation for $314 million. As part of the deal, Anglo American agreed to sell a 34% stake in South African Breweries (later becoming SABMiller PLC, Anheuser-Busch InBev), valued at $716 million, to Premier in exchange for additional Premier shares.

In 1985, Premier's Chairman, Tony Bloom, along with several other of South Africa's most powerful business leaders, openly defied President P.W. Botha by meeting with the exiled ANC leadership in Lusaka, Zambia, to discuss social, political and economic reform.  "[Bloom]...campaigned vigorously for the immediate release of political prisoners, including ANC leader Nelson Mandela, for the end of the state of emergency and for other steps that would permit negotiations on a new constitutional system based on the principle of one person, one vote."

In 2011, international investment group Brait S.E. became the strategic long-term shareholder in Premier Foods, increasing its shareholding from 49.9% of Premier to the current 90% shareholding.

In 2012, Premier Foods entered Swaziland through the acquisition of a controlling stake in Mr. Bread and Swaziland United Bakeries, and in 2013, the company acquired Manhattan confectionery and Lil-lets (SA and UK).

Operations
As of 2016, Premier operated 16 bakeries, 7 wheat mills, 3 maize mills, a sugar confectionery plant, a feminine hygiene manufacturing plant, a biscuit plant, a pasta plant, and an animal feeds plant. The company has 22 distribution depots in South Africa, Swaziland, Lesotho and Mozambique, and a Lil-lets sales office in the UK.

Brands
Premier owns brands across a number of categories, including staple foods, confectionery, personal care, and home care.

Bread
 Blue Ribbon
 BB Bread
 Star Bread
 Mister Bread
 S.U.B

Wheat
 Snowflake

Maize
 Iwisa
 Invicta
 Nyala
 SuperSun

Breakfast
 Thrive
 Iwisa
 Nyala

Confectionery
 Manhattan
 Super C
 Mister Sweet

Personal care

 Lil-lets SA
 Lil-lets UK
 Dove

Home care

 Vulco

Corporate social responsibility
Premier's Blue Ribbon bread brand hosts an annual initiative, established in 2015, called The Blue Ribbon Sandwich Challenge. Blue Ribbon bakeries around South Africa challenge each other to make the highest number of sandwiches for charity, with the goal of feeding as many people across the country as possible.

See also
 List of companies of South Africa

References

External links 

 Premier Milling - Newtown mill, c.1916

Food and drink companies of South Africa
Manufacturing companies based in Johannesburg